Ammoudi tous Volakous ("sandy beach of the rocks") is an uninhabited islet to the south of the western coast of Crete in the Libyan Sea. Just south of Sfakia it is within Sfakia's administration, in Chania regional unit.

See also
List of islands of Greece

Landforms of Chania (regional unit)
Uninhabited islands of Crete
Islands of Greece